Taha Mousa (born 24 May 1987 in Syria) is a Syrian football player who plays for Al-Fotuwa.

References

External links 
Player profile at goal.com

1987 births
Association football goalkeepers
Living people
Syrian footballers
Syria international footballers
Sportspeople from Damascus
Syrian Premier League players